Waimea (literally, "red water" in Hawaiian) is a census-designated place (CDP) in Kauai County, Hawaii, United States. The population was 2,057  at the 2020 census. The first Europeans to reach Hawaii landed in Waimea in 1778 (giving rise to Kauai's cheeky slogan: "Hawaii's Original Visitor Destination").

History

Original settlers 
Between 200 and 600 AD, the first settlers arrived in Kaua‘i from the Marquesas Islands. It is not clear why the voyagers sought a new homeland. They brought taro, sweet potato, pigs and fowl, as well as seeds. They were experienced farmers and fishermen, with advanced irrigation techniques that allowed them to thrive on the land.

Around 1000 AD, Tahitian explorers arrived in Hawai‘i and conquered the Marquesans. According to Hawaiian legend, the small-in-stature Marquesans were chased into the hills by the Tahitians, and became the "Menehune", thought to be responsible for bad luck. The Tahitians brought with them a social and political hierarchy with distinct rules and taboos, also called "kapu". It was forbidden for women and men to eat together, for women to eat pork or bananas, or for anyone to step on the shadow of a royal member. This kapu system, with kings (ali‘i), thrived and ruled for hundreds of years before Western explorers first made contact in the Islands.

First Western contact 

On January 20, 1778, the British explorer, Captain James Cook, and his ships, HMS Discovery and Resolution, arrived at the mouth of the Waimea River on the western side of Kaua‘i. Originally, Cook sent three small craft to Waimea so that his men could determine if it was a good place for the ships to dock. They reported back that there was a freshwater lagoon alongside a native village, so Cook and his men anchored their ships and went ashore on smaller craft.

Cook's mission is thought to be one of scientific and social exploration. His men documented the flora and fauna of the Waimea area, and tried to translate the language of the natives. This first encounter was relatively friendly.

While Cook's first contact with the islands was originally friendly and is responsible for a vast resource of information about the flora, fauna and culture of Hawai‘i, it also marks the beginning of the period of colonization of Hawai‘i and its people. The arrival of Europeans also introduced venereal disease and tuberculosis, which were responsible for decimating the native Hawaiian population.

Economy 

In the late 1700s and early 1800s Waimea was an important trading post for the maritime fur trade, whaling and sandalwood industries, later replaced by the sugar industry in the 1800s. In 1815 the fur trading vessel Atahualpa, purchased by the Russian–American Company and renamed Bering, wrecked at Waimea. Currently, the main industries in Waimea are construction and tourism. There are only two hotels in the town: Waimea Plantation Cottages, and The West Inn motel. There are several shops, small restaurants and food trucks that cater to both the local and tourist population. Waimea is home to the original location of Jo-Jo's Shave Ice, the headquarters for the condiment manufacturer, Aunty Lilikoi.

Geography

It is bordered to the west by Kekaha, to the east by Pakala Village, and to the south by the Pacific Ocean. The Waimea River forms the eastern border of the community.

Climate
Waimea has a Tropical savanna climate (Köppen climate classification: As).

Demographics

As of the census of 2000, there were 1,787 people, 620 households, and 456 families residing in the CDP. The racial makeup of the CDP was 12.7% White, 0.1% African American, 0.2% Native American, 43.0% Asian, 12.3% Pacific Islander, 1.1% from other races, and 30.6% from two or more races. Hispanic or Latino of any race were 7.2% of the population.

There were 620 households, out of which 33.2% had children under the age of 18 living with them, 52.3% were married couples living together, 15.6% had a female householder with no husband present, and 26.3% were non-families. 22.1% of all households were made up of individuals, and 10.5% had someone living alone who was 65 years of age or older.  The average household size was 2.80 and the average family size was 3.27.

In the CDP the population was spread out, with 26.1% under the age of 18, 7.2% from 18 to 24, 22.4% from 25 to 44, 24.8% from 45 to 64, and 19.5% who were 65 years of age or older.  The median age was 41 years. For every 100 females, there were 94.0 males.  For every 100 females age 18 and over, there were 86.8 males.

The median income for a household in the CDP was $44,398, and the median income for a family was $46,591. Males had a median income of $38,542 versus $26,513 for females. The per capita income for the CDP was $18,778.  About 8.1% of families and 11.5% of the population were below the poverty line, including 16.2% of those under age 18 and 8.7% of those age 65 or over.

Culture 
Every February Waimea hosts a celebration of Hawaiian culture at the Waimea Town Celebration. The festival began in 1978, and has expanded into a nine-day event. Activities include a celebration of Kaumuali‘iu, Kaua‘i's last king, a film festival, several concerts, a lei-making contest for paniolo (cowboy) hats, a rodeo, a canoe race, and numerous other sporting events.

The Historic Waimea Theater originally opened on September 2, 1938, and is one of only two remaining movie theaters on the island of Kaua‘i. The theater was damaged by Hurricane Iniki in 1992, and the owner planned on tearing it down. West Kaua‘i Main Street leased the building in 1993,  and began to restore the landmark theater. The County of Kaua‘i purchased the building in 1996, and in August 1999, it again re-opened to the public under the management of West Kauai Business & Professional Association.

Education
Waimea has three public schools: Waimea Canyon Middle School, Waimea High School (the westernmost high school in the United States), and Ni‘ihau High and Elementary School.

See also
Hofgaard Park, Waimea, Kauai

References

Census-designated places in Kauai County, Hawaii
Populated places on Kauai
Populated coastal places in Hawaii